The Binghamton Dusters were an ice hockey team in the American Hockey League. They played in Binghamton, New York, USA at the Broome County Veterans Memorial Arena. The team logo was designed by Johnny Hart, artist of the comic strip "B.C." and a native of nearby Endicott N.Y.  The team was known for using the Jim Croce song "Bad, Bad Leroy Brown" as their entrance theme.

History
The Broome County Dusters originated as a North American Hockey League Team (NAHL) in its inaugural season in 1973-74. 

 The market was previously served by:
 Broome Dusters of the NAHL (1973–1977)
The market was subsequently home to:
 Binghamton Whalers of the American Hockey League (AHL) (1980–1990)
 Binghamton Rangers of the AHL (1990–1997)
 B.C. Icemen of the United Hockey League (UHL) (1997–2002)
 Binghamton Senators of the AHL (2002–2017)
 Binghamton Devils of the AHL (2017–2021)

Team records

Single season
Goals: 87 Dave Staffen  (1976–77)
Assists: 63 Joe Hardy  (1977–78)
Points: 87 Joe Hardy  (1977–78)
Penalty Minutes: 267 Rick Dorman  (1979–80)
GAA:
SV%:

Career
Career Goals: 83 Richard Grenier 
Career Assists: 98 Randy MacGregor 
Career Points: 168 Randy MacGregor 
Career Penalty Minutes: 394 Randy MacGregor 
Career Goaltending Wins:
Career Shutouts:
Career Games: 213 Randy MacGregor

Season-by-season results
 Broome Dusters 1973–1977 (North American Hockey League)
 Broome Dusters 1977–1980 (American Hockey League)

Regular season

Playoffs

References

External links
 The Internet Hockey Database - Binghamton Dusters
 BinghamtonHockey.net - Hockey History of Binghamton Hockey

 
Sports in Binghamton, New York
Ice hockey teams in New York (state)
Ice hockey clubs established in 1977
Sports clubs disestablished in 1980
1977 establishments in New York (state)
1980 disestablishments in New York (state)
Boston Bruins minor league affiliates